Wheel is a brand of laundry soap and detergent owned by Unilever. The brand was introduced in the Philippines in 1952 as a laundry soap by Philippine Refining Company (now Unilever Philippines). The brand was introduced in India in 1985 as a laundry detergent by Hindustan Unilever Ltd.

References

Unilever brands
Laundry detergents
Philippine brands
Indian brands